The former railroad network Pennsylvania-Reading Seashore Lines operated in New Jersey from 1933, serving Philadelphia, Atlantic City, Camden and Cape May. Timetables were introduced in June 1934 and June 1941.

Timetables from June 24, 1934
Source:

Boardwalk Flyer - Train #159 (lounge car) dep Camden 3:08 PM, arr Atlantic City 4:05 PM
Rocket - Train # 165 (lounge car) dep Camden 4:08 PM, arr Atlantic City 5:05 PM
Quaker City Express - Train # 120 (lounge car) dep Atlantic City 7:10 AM, arr Camden 8:07 AM

Timetables from June 22, 1941
Source:

Atlantic City Angler – Train # 103 dep Camden 5:23 AM, arr Atlantic City 6:30 AM
Boardwalk Arrow – Train # 1003 (Buffet Parlor Car) dep Philadelphia 6:45 AM, arr Atlantic City 8:10 AM
The Flying Eagle – Train # 1007 (Parlor Car) dep Philadelphia 8:50 AM, arr Atlantic City 10:15 AM
The Flying Cloud – Train # 1009 (Parlor Car) dep Philadelphia 9:50 AM, arr Atlantic City 11:10 AM
The Sea Lion – Train # 1011 (Parlor Car) dep Philadelphia 10:50 AM, arr Atlantic City 12:15 PM
The Pilot - Train # 1019 (Parlor Car) dep Philadelphia 11:15 AM, arr Atlantic City 12:35 PM
The Ozone – Train # 1013 or 1023 (Parlor Car) dep Philadelphia 11:55 AM, arr Atlantic City 1:15 PM
The Shore Queen – Train # 1015 (Parlor Car) dep Philadelphia 12:55, arr Atlantic City 2:15 PM
The Jolly Tar – Train # 1017 (Parlor Car) dep Philadelphia 1:50 PM, arr Atlantic City 3:10 PM
The Boardwalk Flyer – Train # 159 (Lounge Car) dep Camden 3:08 PM, arr Atlantic City 4:00 PM
Seashore Limited - Train # 1021 dep Philadelphia 3:30 PM, arr Atlantic City 4:55 PM (Parlor Car Daily, Buffet Parlor Car from North Philadelphia weekdays except Fridays and Sats.)
Barnacle Bill Special – Train # 165 or 167 (Lounge Car) dep Camden 4:08 PM, arr Atlantic City 5:05 PM
The Cruiser - Train # 1025 (Sleeper as parlor) dep Philadelphia 4:25 PM, arr Atlantic City 5:50 PM
The Sea Hawk – Train # 1027 (Parlor Car) dep Philadelphia 6:50 PM, arr Atlantic City 8:10 PM
The Twilight - Train # 1031 (Parlor Car) dep Philadelphia 8:45, arr Atlantic City 10:05 PM
The Honeymooner – Train # 1033 (Parlor Car) dep Philadelphia 10:45 PM, arr Atlantic City 12:10 AM (night)
The Skipper – Train # 1002 dep Atlantic City 6:00 AM, arr Philadelphia 7:21 AM
Barnacle Bill Special – Train # 116 (Lounge Car) dep Atlantic City 6:40 AM, arr Camden 7:37 AM
The Cruiser – Train # 1004 (Parlor Car) dep Atlantic City 6:45 AM, arr Philadelphia 8:05 AM.
The Dolphin – Train # 1006 (Parlor Car) dep Atlantic City 7:30 AM, arr Philadelphia 8:53 AM
The Sea Hawk – Train # 1010 (Parlor Car) dep Atlantic City 8:40 AM, arr Philadelphia 10:00 AM
The Navigator” – Train # 1012 (Sleeper as Parlor) dep 10:35 AM, arr Philadelphia 12:05 PM
Seashore Limited – Train # 1016 dep Atlantic City 12:45 PM, arr Philadelphia 2:10 PM (Parlor Car Daily, Buffet Parlor Car to North Philadelphia weekdays)
The Beach Patrol – Train # 1020 (Parlor Car) dep Atlantic City 3:45 PM, arr Philadelphia 5:10 PM
The Flying Cloud – Train # 1024 (Parlor Car) dep Atlantic City 4:40 PM, arr Philadelphia 6:05 PM
The Flying Eagle – Train # 1026 (Parlor Car) dep Atlantic City 5:40 PM, arr Philadelphia 7:03 PM
The Ocean Wave - Train # 1028 (Parlor Car) dep Atlantic City 6:45 PM, arr Philadelphia 8:09 PM
The Sea Gull – Train # 1032 (Parlor Car – Buffet service) dep Atlantic City 7:50 PM, arr Philadelphia 9:15 PM
Boardwalk Arrow – Train # 1034 (Parlor Car) dep Atlantic City 8:40 PM, arr Philadelphia 10:00 PM
The Sea Lion – Train # 1036 (Parlor Car Sundays and holidays) dep Atlantic City 9:40 PM, arr Philadelphia 11:03
The Sand Piper – Train # 1038 (Parlor Car) dep 10:40 PM, arr Philadelphia 12:02 AM (night)

To/from Cape May County Resorts

(Cape May Court House, Wildwood, Cape May Harbor, and Cape May; Stone Harbor and Avalon by connecting bus at Cape May Court House)

Fishermen's Special – Train # 485 (Sundays & holidays) dep Camden 5:08 AM, arr Cape May Harbor 6:40 AM
Fishermen's Special – Train # 425 (other days) dep Camden 6:08 AM, arr Cape May Harbor 7:40 AM
The Resorter – Train # 1053, dep Philadelphia 8:25 AM, arr Wildwood Crest 10:34, arr Cape May 10:32
The Resorter – Train # 1060, dep Cape May 2:50 PM, dep Wildwood Crest 2:47 PM, arr Philadelphia 4:59 PM
Fishermen's Special – Train # 486 or 430 dep Cape May Harbor 3:50 PM, arr Camden 5:22 PM

References

Pennsylvania-Reading Seashore Lines